Diatonic set theory is a subdivision or application of musical set theory which applies the techniques and analysis of discrete mathematics to properties of the diatonic collection such as maximal evenness, Myhill's property, well formedness, the deep scale property, cardinality equals variety, and structure implies multiplicity. The name is something of a misnomer as the concepts involved usually apply much more generally, to any periodically repeating scale.

Music theorists working in diatonic set theory include Eytan Agmon, Gerald J. Balzano, Norman Carey, David Clampitt, John Clough, Jay Rahn, and mathematician Jack Douthett. A number of key concepts were first formulated by David Rothenberg (the Rothenberg propriety), who published in the journal Mathematical Systems Theory, and Erv Wilson, working entirely outside of the academic world.

See also
Bisector
Diatonic and chromatic
Generic and specific intervals

Further reading
Balzano, Gerald, "The Pitch Set as a Level of Description for Studying Musical Pitch Perception", Music, Mind and Brain, the Neurophysiology of Music, Manfred Clynes, ed., Plenum Press, 1982.
Carey, Norman and Clampitt, David (1996), "Self-Similar Pitch Structures, Their Duals, and Rhythmic Analogues", Perspectives of New Music 34, no. 2: 62–87.
Grady, Kraig, (2007), "An Introduction to the Moments of Symmetry", Wilson Archives, anaphoria.com
Johnson, Timothy (2003), Foundations of Diatonic Theory: A Mathematically Based Approach to Music Fundamentals, Key College Publishing. .

Precursors
Rahn, Jay (1977), "Some Recurrent Features of Scales", In Theory Only 2, nos. 11–12: 43–52.
Rothenberg, David, (1977), "A Model for Pattern Perception with Musical Applications", Mathematical Systems Theory, part I: 11, 199–234 ; part II: 353–372 ; part III: (1978) 12, 73–101 .
Wilson, Erv (1975), "Handwritten letter to John Chalmers pertaining to 'Moments of Symmetry'/'Tanabe Cycle', 26 April 1975, 27 pages, anaphoria.com

 
Musicology